Paul Traynor (born September 14, 1977) is a Canadian former professional ice hockey player who finished his career in Norway with the Stavanger Oilers of the GET-ligaen.

Playing career
Born in Thunder Bay, Ontario, Traynor was a seventh-round draft pick for the Winnipeg Jets, selected as the 162nd pick in the 1995 NHL Entry Draft, but never managed to play in the National Hockey League.

He first moved to Germany in 2004 playing for the Kölner Haie and then signed in June 2006 with Iserlohn Roosters. Before his move, he had played for teams in the American Hockey League, International Hockey League and the East Coast Hockey League. On April 19, 2009, he left the Roosters and joined Wolfsburg Grizzly Adams on a two-year contract.

On May 13, 2011, Traynor moved to his fourth DEL club, joining the Thomas Sabo Ice Tigers on a one-year contract.

Career statistics

References

External links

1977 births
Albany River Rats players
Canadian ice hockey defencemen
Charlotte Checkers (1993–2010) players
Ice hockey people from Ontario
Iserlohn Roosters players
Kalamazoo Wings (1974–2000) players
Kitchener Rangers players
Kölner Haie players
Living people
Sportspeople from Thunder Bay
Raleigh IceCaps players
Rochester Americans players
South Carolina Stingrays players
Stavanger Oilers players
Syracuse Crunch players
Thomas Sabo Ice Tigers players
Trenton Titans players
Utah Grizzlies (IHL) players
Winnipeg Jets (1979–1996) draft picks
Grizzlys Wolfsburg players
Canadian expatriate ice hockey players in Norway
Canadian expatriate ice hockey players in Germany
Canadian expatriate ice hockey players in the United States